The 2001 Husky WCT Players' Championship, the championship of the men's World Curling Tour  for the 2000-01 curling season was held March 21–25, 2001 at the Calgary Curling Club in Calgary, Alberta. The total purse for the event was $150,000 with $40,000 going to the winning team. The top Canadian team received a berth into the 2001 Canadian Olympic Curling Trials.

Wayne Middaugh of Ontario defeated Kevin Martin of Alberta in the final, 10–5. Middaugh made a triple take out in the first end to go up 3–0. In the second end, Martin ticked a guard on his final shot, which was an attempted hit for two. The miss gave Middaugh a steal of one to go up 4–0. Martin got one the scoreboard with a single in the third, but missed a draw attempt in the fourth, allowing Middaugh to make a tap for three to go up 7–1. That put the game out of reach for Martin, as Middaugh played a peel game to protect the lead.   

As the two finalist teams had already qualified for the Olympic Trials, the berth went to the winner of a special third place playoff between Russ Howard of New Brunswick and Peter Corner of Ontario. Howard won that game 7–3.

The event was the last Players' Championship to be held before the creation of the Grand Slam of Curling, which included the Players' as one of its events. 

The semifinals and finals were aired on Global TV.

Teams
The event featured the top 20 Canadian money earners on the World Curling Tour, the top two European earners, and the top American team, along with a sponsors exemption (Vic Peters). Kerry Burtnyk, Kevin Park and Randy Ferbey elected to not participate (Team Ferbey was preparing for the 2001 World Men's Curling Championship). John Morris, Greg McAulay, Jeff Stoughton, Bert Gretzinger, Wayne Middaugh and Kevin Martin had already qualified for the Olympic Trials. 

The teams were as follows:

Round-robin standings
The top two teams in each pool advanced to the playoffs. 

Final round-robin standings

Scores
Scores were as follows:

Draw 1
Middaugh 7, Brewster 4
Stoughton 10, Werthemann 4
McMullan 8, Derbowka 5
Brown 9, R. Howard 5
G. Howard 10, Lyburn 2
Climenhaga 8, Boehmer 6

Draw 2
Peters 7, Hemmings 1
McAulay 6, Despins 2
Korte 5, Kirkness 2
Martin 7, Patterson 2 
Morris 7, Corner 2
Gretzinger 6, Ewen 5

Draw 3
Climenhaga 6, G. Howard 5
Derbowka 8, Middaugh 2
Werthemann 9, Brewster 7
Stoughton 5, McMullan 3 
Boehmer 7, R. Howard 6
Brown 5, Lyburn 4

Draw 4
Gretzinger 7, Morris 2
Team Hemmings 6, Korte 3
McAulay 9, Peters 2
Despins 7, Kirkness 3 
Martin 6, Ewen 2
Corner 6, Patterson 4

Draw 5
Corner 10, Ewen 9
Morris 5, Patterson 1
Team Hemmings 8, Kirkness 4
Korte 8, McAulay 6
Despins 5, Peters 2
Martin 7, Gretzinger 5

Draw 6
Lyburn 6, Boehmer 3
G. Howard 6, Brown 3
Middaugh 9, McMullan 3
Derbowka 9, Werthemann 2
Brewster 8, Stoughton 7
R. Howard 7, Climenhaga 5

Draw 7
Martin 8, Morris 6
Corner 8, Gretzinger 4
Patterson 9, Ewen 6
Team Hemmings 8, Despins 6
McAulay 10, Kirkness 3
Korte 6, Peters 4

Draw 8
R. Howard 10, G. Howard 8
Climenhaga 7, Lyburn 3
Boehmer 9, Brown 5
Middaugh 6, Stoughton 5
McMullan 9, Werthemann 5
Brewster 4, Derbowka 3

Draw 9
Stoughton 8, Derbowka 2
Brewster 8, McMullan 7
R. Howard 9, Lyburn 4
G. Howard 7, Boehmer 6
Climenhaga 7, Brown 6
Middaugh 6, Werthemann 1

Draw 10
McAulay 7, Team Hemmings 2
Korte 8, Despins 6
Peters 9, Kirkness 6
Corner 6, Martin 4
Ewen 5, Morris 4
Gretzinger 7, Patterson 6

Tiebreakers
Stoughton 5, Brewster 4
R. Howard 8, G. Howard 6

Playoffs

Notes

References

Players Championships, 2001
2001 in Alberta 
Curling competitions in Calgary
Players' Championship
March 2001 sports events in Canada